Varadharaj Jayaraman is an Indian politician and a member of the Tamil Nadu Legislative Assembly from the Pollachi constituency. He was previously selected from Pollachi constituency (2001-2006)(2006-2011)respectively and elected from constituency from (2011-2016) and (2016-2021). He was Minister in the 2nd Jayalalithaa government as Minister for Industries, Environment, Pollution Control (2001-2002),and again as Minister for Food, Civil Supplies and Co-operative (2004-2006). He is one among the 3 MLAs from ADMK to record winning 5 times consecutively in assembly elections from 2001 on-wards from Pollachi and Udumalpet constituencies where others being O.Pannerselvam and K.P.Anbazhagan. Jayaraman also won the recent Tamil Nadu State Assembly elections held in the month May, 2021 from the same constituency.

References 

All India Anna Dravida Munnetra Kazhagam politicians
Living people
Deputy Speakers of the Tamil Nadu Legislative Assembly
People from Tiruppur district
Tamil Nadu MLAs 2001–2006
Tamil Nadu MLAs 2006–2011
Tamil Nadu MLAs 2016–2021
Tamil Nadu MLAs 2021–2026
Year of birth missing (living people)